Julio Daniel Losada (born 16 June 1950 in Uruguay) is a former Uruguayan footballer most notable for his time spent at Greek club Olympiacos. He also played for C.A. Peñarol.

At the age of 22, he made the trip to Piraeus and joined Olympiakos as yet another superstar of the Goulandris era. President of the club at the time, Goulandris was noted for signing star players; Losada being one of the largest. Together with teammate and French International striker Yves Triantafillos, Losada created one of the greatest attacking lines in Olympiacos history.

Small in height, Losada was fierce from the right wing and quickly became a legend to the Olympiacos fans, who he played in front of for 8 seasons. Finishing his time with the Greek club in 1980, Losada played with the red and white shirt during 146 games, scoring 30 goals in the Greek First Division. He is second in the club's all time appearances for a foreign player behind Predrag Đorđević.

Julio Losada was capped by the Uruguay National Team twice during the 1970 FIFA World Cup against Israel and Sweden. Losada made five appearances in total for Uruguay.

Honours 
 Greek First Division Championship: (4) : 1972-1973, 1973-1974, 1974-1975, 1979-1980
 Greek Cup: (2) : 1972-1973, 1974–1975

References

External links 
Julio Losada phantis.com

1950 births
Living people
Uruguayan footballers
Uruguayan expatriate footballers
Uruguay international footballers
Uruguayan Primera División players
Super League Greece players
Peñarol players
Olympiacos F.C. players
Expatriate footballers in Greece
1970 FIFA World Cup players
Greek people of Uruguayan descent
Naturalized citizens of Greece
Association football forwards